is a former Japanese football player.

Club statistics

References

External links

1980 births
Living people
Nippon Sport Science University alumni
Association football people from Ibaraki Prefecture
Japanese footballers
J2 League players
Mito HollyHock players
Shonan Bellmare players
Montedio Yamagata players
Association football defenders